Black Arrow, officially capitalised BLACK ARROW, was a British satellite carrier rocket. Developed during the 1960s, it was used for four launches between 1969 and 1971, all launched from the Woomera Prohibited Area in Australia. Its final flight was the first and only successful orbital launch to be conducted by the United Kingdom, and placed the Prospero satellite into low Earth orbit.

Black Arrow originated from studies by the Royal Aircraft Establishment for carrier rockets based on the Black Knight rocket, with the project being authorised in 1964. It was initially developed by Saunders-Roe, and later Westland Aircraft as the result of a merger.

Black Arrow was a three-stage rocket, fuelled by RP-1 paraffin (kerosene) and high test peroxide, a concentrated form of hydrogen peroxide (85% hydrogen peroxide + 15% water). It was retired after only four launches in favour of using American Scout rockets, which the Ministry of Defence calculated to be cheaper than maintaining the Black Arrow programme.

Development
Black Arrow originated from a Royal Aircraft Establishment proposal for a rocket capable of placing a  payload into low Earth orbit, in order to test systems designed for larger spacecraft. In the autumn of 1964, the programme was authorised by Conservative Aviation Minister Julian Amery.  Then, following a general election in October, the incoming Labour government put the project on hold to reduce expenditure.  Following another election, the government approved the continuation of the programme with several modifications, including the reduction of the test programme from five to three launches. The maiden launch was set for 1968.

Most of the technology and systems used on Black Arrow had already been developed or flight-proven on the Black Knight rocket, or the Blue Steel missile. Black Arrow was designed to reuse as much technology from the earlier programmes as possible in order to reduce costs, and simplify the development process. Many senior staff of the Black Knight programme transferred directly to Black Arrow, including the Chief Missile Scientist Roy Dommett, the Chief Design Engineer Ray Wheeler, and the Deputy Chief Engineer John Underwood.

Initial development was conducted by Saunders-Roe, which merged into Westland Aircraft in 1964. Westland was subsequently the prime contractor for the Black Arrow, and assembled the first and second stages at East Cowes on the Isle of Wight, later testing the rockets from the 1950s up until the rocket launch on 28 October 1971. Bristol Siddeley produced the first and second stage engines at a factory in Ansty, Warwickshire. The engines were test fired at the factory before being shipped to the Isle of Wight, where they were integrated into the rocket and the first stage engines were fired again at High Down. Bristol Aerojet produced the third stage in Somerset, while the Explosives Research and Development Establishment produced its solid propellant in Waltham Abbey, Essex. The Rocket Propulsion Establishment, based in Westcott, Buckinghamshire, was responsible for the design and integration of the stage.

The name Black Arrow came from the Ministry of Supply policy of assigning designations consisting of a colour and a noun, unofficially known as Rainbow Codes, to research programmes conducted by the Armed Forces.

Vehicle

The first and second stages of the Black Arrow were fuelled by RP-1 paraffin (kerosene), burnt using high test peroxide as an oxidiser. Due to the optimum mixture ratio being about 7, a larger oxidiser tank was required compared to many contemporary launch systems. The oxidiser tanks were located below the fuel tanks, following the practice of putting the more dense propellant at the top in order move the centre of gravity higher and make the rocket more stable, when in flight, and thus easier to control. This arrangement had been pioneered by Germany and the United States, whereas the Soviet Union had placed oxidiser tanks above fuel tanks, making it easier for the lower tank to be filled first.

Thrust vectoring was used to provide attitude control on the first two stages. The eight first stage combustion chambers were arranged in pairs which could gimbal either way along one axis. Two of the pairs were arranged perpendicular to the other two, and when all four pairs were used together, they provided roll, pitch and yaw control. The second stage had two combustion chambers, which could gimbal along two axes, providing the same level of control. During a coast phase after second stage cut-off, the rocket was controlled by a reaction control system. The third stage did not have an attitude control system, and was instead spin-stabilised.

The first stage was powered by a single Gamma 8 engine, which burned for 127 seconds. The Gamma 8 was an eight-chamber engine, derived from the Gamma 301 engine used on the Black Knight. Coralie was used as the second stage of the Europa rocket, and the decision to give Black Arrow the same diameter as Coralie was taken in order to make it compatible with Blue Streak, which was used as the first stage of Europa. This would have allowed Black Arrow's payload capacity to have been increased, and would also have allowed Britain to use the first stage of Black Arrow as a backup to the Coralie. For this reason, all dimensions in the original specification were given in imperial units except the first stage diameter, which was given in metric units.

The first and second stages were connected by an interstage structure containing four Siskin IB separation and ullage motors, which separated and ignited seven seconds after the first stage had cut off. The interstage separated from the second stage six seconds later. Three minutes after launch, during the second stage burn, the payload fairing separated.

About 257 seconds into the flight, the second stage cut off, and the rocket entered a coast phase to apogee. Immediately after cut-off, the second stage attitude control system was pressurised. During the coast the correct orientation for third stage separation was maintained by means of the attitude control system. Towards the end of the coast period, the third stage was spun up to a rate of 3 hertz (180 rpm) by means of six Imp rockets. Five seconds later, the third stage separated, and following ten more seconds of coasting, it ignited. The third stage was a Waxwing solid rocket motor, which burned for 55 seconds.

Just over a minute after the third stage had burned out, the payload was released, and gas generators were used to push the spacecraft and spent upper stage apart. The delay between burnout and separation was intended to reduce the risk of recontact between the upper stage and payload due to residual thrust. Despite this, following spacecraft separation on the R3 launch, the upper stage collided with the Prospero satellite, damaging one of the spacecraft's communications antennae; however the spacecraft was still able to successfully complete its mission. On the R3 launch, the ascent took  from liftoff to spacecraft separation.

Although none were ever built, several derivatives of Black Arrow were also proposed, as ways of increasing its payload capacity. One proposal added eight Raven solid rocket motors from the Skylark programme to the first stage as booster rockets. Another suggestion was to mount the entire rocket atop a Blue Streak missile, while a third proposal involved replacing the Gamma engines with the more powerful Larch.

Launches

Four Black Arrows were launched between 1969 and 1971. The first two launches were demonstration flights, with battleship third stages and a boilerplate payload. On the maiden flight an electrical fault caused a pair of first stage combustion chambers to pivot back and forth. Before it cleared the launch pad, the rocket was rolling erratically, and about a minute later it began to disintegrate. After the first stage engine failed, and the rocket began to fall back to earth, it was destroyed by range safety. The second launch was successful. The first all-up launch on 2 September 1970 was the third launch of the Black Arrow, and Britain's first attempt to launch a satellite. The launch failed due to a leak in the second stage oxidiser pressurisation system, which caused it to cut out early. The third stage fired, but the rocket did not reach orbit, and re-entered over the Gulf of Carpentaria. The fourth launch successfully orbited the Prospero (before the R2 mission, it was named Puck) satellite, making the United Kingdom the sixth nation to place a satellite into orbit by means of an indigenously developed carrier rocket. The satellite, also known as X-3, was named Prospero after the character Prospero in Shakespeare's The Tempest. The name was chosen as a reference to events in the play, in which Prospero, a sorcerer, gives up his powers. Prior to the cancellation of the Black Arrow programme, the satellite was to be named after Puck from A Midsummer Night's Dream.

All four launches were conducted from Launch Area 5B at the Woomera Prohibited Area in Australia, which had previously been used as a test site for the Black Knight rocket. During the development programme, launch sites in Barbados, Uist and Norfolk were also considered. The launch sites at Uist and Norfolk were rejected because the former was too remote, while there was a risk that a rocket launched from the latter might drop spent stages on an oil rig in the North Sea.

Cancellation

The Minister of State for Trade and Industry, Frederick Corfield, announced the cancellation of the Black Arrow project in the House of Commons on 29 July 1971. As the R3 rocket had already been shipped to the launch site, the second stage having arrived three days earlier, permission was given for it to be launched.

The programme was cancelled on economic grounds, as the Ministry of Defence decided that it would be cheaper to use the American Scout rocket, which had a similar payload capacity, for future launches. Prior to the cancellation of Black Arrow, NASA had offered to launch British payloads for free; however, this offer was withdrawn following the decision to cancel Black Arrow.

The final Black Arrow to be completed was R4, which did not fly, and is preserved in the Science Museum, London, along with the flight spare for the Prospero satellite. A replica of the Black Arrow rocket stands in the Rocket Park at Woomera. In addition, the remains of the first stage of Black Arrow R3 were recovered from the Anna Creek cattle station and were displayed in the William Creek Memorial Park. Due to weather and vandalism related damage, the first stage was returned to the United Kingdom in an initiative led by Skyrora to preserve the artefact. It was displayed in Penicuik, Scotland, in early 2019; as of 2021, the rocket is on loan to the Farnborough Air Sciences Trust Museum through 2024.

The launch facilities at Woomera were demolished within a year of the final flight, and half of the engineers who had worked on the programme were laid off. The X-4 satellite, which had been manifested for launch by Black Arrow R4, was eventually launched on 9 March 1974, by an American Scout D-1 rocket flying from Space Launch Complex 5 at the Vandenberg Air Force Base in California.

As of 2022, the United Kingdom is the only country to have successfully developed and then abandoned a satellite launch capability. All other countries that have developed such a capability have retained it either through their own space programme or, in the case of France, through its involvement in the Ariane programme.

See also

 Comparison of orbital launchers families
 Comparison of orbital launch systems
Ariel 1
British National Space Centre
Diamant
Juno I
Lambda (rocket family)
Satellite Launch Vehicle
Sputnik (rocket)
 Black Knight

References

External links
 Listen Ray Wheeler, Chief Design Engineer, discussing Black Arrow - part of a life story interview recorded for An Oral History of British Science at the British Library

1969 in spaceflight
1971 in spaceflight
Cold War military equipment of the United Kingdom
High-test peroxide
Saunders-Roe
Space launch vehicles of the United Kingdom
History of science and technology in the United Kingdom